The 2019 THB Champions League is the 53rd season of the THB Champions League, the top-tier football league in Madagascar. The season started on 8 March 2019.

First phase
The top two teams of each group advance to the championship playoff.

Group A
Final table.

 1.Fosa Juniors Elite FC (Boeny)          4   4  0  0  20- 1  12       Division 1
 2.Ajesaia (Bongolava)                    4   2  1  1  18- 5   7       Division 1
 - - - - - - - - - - - - - - - - - - - - - - - - - - - - - - - -
 3.JSMS (Diana)                           4   1  2  1   8-10   5       Division 2
 4.TAM Port Bergé (Sofia)                 4   1  1  2   9- 6   4       Division 2
 5.JSA Antalaha (Sava)                    4   0  0  4   3-36   0       Division 2
 - - - - - - - - - - - - - - - - - - - - - - - - - - - - - - - -
 -.3FB (Betsiboka)                        withdrew

Group B
Final table.

 1.AS Adema (Analamanga)                  4   3  1  0   4- 1  10       Division 1
 2.AS JET Mada (Itasy)                    4   2  2  0   3- 1   8       Division 1
 - - - - - - - - - - - - - - - - - - - - - - - - - - - - - - - -
 3.Tia Kitra (Antsinanana)                4   2  0  2   5- 4   6       Division 2
 4.Club M (Analanjirofo)                  4   1  0  3   3- 3   3       Division 2
 5.Voromaherin'Alaotra (Alaotra Mangoro)  4   0  1  3   2- 8   1       Division 2
 - - - - - - - - - - - - - - - - - - - - - - - - - - - - - - - -
 -.AJSM Maintirano (Melaky)               withdrew

Group C
Final table.

 1.Zanak'Ala FC (Haute Matsiatra)         5   5  0  0  21- 2  15       Division 1
 2.CNaPS Sport (Itasy)                    5   4  0  1  18- 4  12  [C]  Division 1
 - - - - - - - - - - - - - - - - - - - - - - - - - - - - - - - -
 3.FC Vakinankaratra (Vakinakaratra)      5   3  0  2  10- 8   9       Division 2
 4.Jofama FC Ambositra (Amoron'Imania)    5   2  0  3   6-16   6       Division 2
 5.AS Fitafa (Atsimo-Atsinanana)          5   1  0  4   5-15   3       Division 2
 - - - - - - - - - - - - - - - - - - - - - - - - - - - - - - - -
 6.FC Grand Sud Est (Menabe)              5   0  0  5   2-17   0

Group D
Final table.

 1.FCA Ilakaka (Ihorombe)                 5   3  2  0   7- 2  11       Division 1
 2.3FB Toliara (Atsimo Andrefana)         5   3  1  1   9- 3  10       Division 1
 - - - - - - - - - - - - - - - - - - - - - - - - - - - - - - - -
 3.COSFA (Analamanga)                     5   2  2  1  12- 3   8       Division 2
 4.DCF Tôlanaro (Anosy)                   5   2  2  1   5- 6   8       Division 2
 5.VFM Manakara (V7V)                     5   1  1  3   5- 9   4       Division 2
 - - - - - - - - - - - - - - - - - - - - - - - - - - - - - - - -
 6.AS Rohondroho (Androy)                 5   0  0  5   2-17   0

Division 1
Final table.

 1.Fosa Juniors Elite FC (Boeny)          7   5  2  0  15- 6  17       Champions
 2.AS Adema (Analamanga)                  7   3  3  1   8- 6  12
 3.CNaPS Sports (Itasy)                   7   3  2  2  11- 5  11
 4.Zanak'Ala FC (Haute Matsiatra)         7   3  1  3   8- 9  10
 5.3FB Toliara (Atsimo Andrefana)         7   3  0  4   5- 6   9
 6.AS JET Mada (Itasy)                    7   1  4  2   8- 7   7
 7.FCA Ilakaka (Ihorombe)                 7   1  3  3   5-13   6
 8.Ajesaia (Bongolava)                    7   0  3  4   2-10   3

Stadiums

References

Madagascar
Football leagues in Madagascar
Premier League